Pausa is, in linguistics, the end of a prosodic unit.

Pausa may also refer to:
 Rest (music)

Places 
 France
 La Pausa, a villa in Roquebrune-Cap-Martin
 Germany
 Pausa, Saxony
 Peru
 Pausa, Peru
 Pausa District
 Romania
 Păuşa (disambiguation), various places
 Păuşa River

Media 
Pausa Records, USA division of an Italian jazz recording company
Pausa, a 1992 short film by director Alik Sakharov
Pausa, a 2020 extended play by Ricky Martin

See also 
 Pausha, the Hindu month